12 Feet Deep (originally titled The Deep End) is a 2017 American psychological horror-thriller film written and directed by Matt Eskandari. It stars Alexandra Park and Nora-Jane Noone as sisters who find themselves trapped inside a public swimming pool when the manager of the aquatic center, without knowing the sisters are still inside, activates the pool cover and leaves for the holidays. Released by Mar Vista Entertainment on June 20, 2017, it received generally positive reviews.

Plot
Bree decides to go for a swim at the Ketea Aquatic Center. The pool manager, McGradey, later hangs signs around the pool mentioning that the pool is closing up for the holiday. Bree is later joined by her sister, Jonna, a recovering drug addict who is three months clean. In the pool, the two sisters connect over a competition in college. Clara, the janitor of the aquatic center and an ex-convict on parole, is caught by McGradey attempting to steal from the lost and found. She is fired and told to clean up before leaving. McGradey then eagerly tells all swimmers to leave as they prepare to close. Bree and Jonna reluctantly do so. While packing up, Bree realizes that her engagement ring is missing, after attempting to show Jonna. Jonna sees the ring stuck in the metal grate at the bottom of the pool and both dive in to retrieve it. McGradey thinks everyone has left the pool and decides to close up, failing to notice the women in the deep end of the pool. He engages the pool cover and leaves for the day with the two women trapped inside the pool.

The women are terrified and unsuccessfully attempt to escape. Shortly afterward, Jonna reveals that she is secretly jealous of Bree's successful lifestyle and recent engagement and that she pulled the ring from Bree's bag and threw it in the pool. Bree is initially angry with her sister but her anger is short-lived. Bree also talks about her past with her abusive alcoholic and drug addicted father. She also opens up about the fire which led to his death. Bree reveals that she is diabetic and requires a shot, or there is a possibility that she might slip into a diabetic coma.

Clara, preparing to leave, is surprised to see the two women trapped underneath the pool cover. Leading the women to believe she is going to help them, she picks up Bree's bag, taking her cash, smartphone and credit card. Clara then proceeds to blackmail her for the password to her phone and her credit card PIN. She later turns the water heater off. The girls have no choice but to wait out the night. Jonna talks about the deep mental damage from her abusive father with Bree saying, "Just keep reminding yourself that he's dead." Clara comes back in the morning teasing the sisters again. Jonna, angry at her, leads Clara to place her ear onto the small hole in the pool cover, subsequently stabbing her in the ear with a sharp shard of tile. Clara then turns on the automatic pool cleaning system, causing the girls to begin suffocating in chlorine. After a few minutes, she turns this off, realizing the danger in her action. When Clara leaves again, Jonna apologizes to Bree for her jealousy and keeps blaming herself for the situation they're in. Bree comforts her and forgives her for her wrongdoings. Bree reveals that during the accident which killed their father, she actually prevented her dad from escaping, saying "I killed that monster". Clara comes back, realizing the error of her ways. She decides to open up the pool cover to let Bree and Jonna out but the pass code she was given by McGradey no longer works, leaving the women to remain trapped. She tells the sisters they're on their own and leaves.

Bree soon grows very weak and cold, passing in and out of consciousness. After initially refusing Bree's offer to try, Jonna spends her last bits of energy trying to rip off the metal grill on the bottom of the pool, something her sister failed to do. After succeeding, Jonna smashes the fiberglass of the pool cover, allowing them to escape. She then pulled Bree, unconscious, out of the pool and gives her the insulin shot, unsure whether she will survive. Clara appears in front of them with a gun. She threatens to kill Bree and Jonna after thinking about what might happen if they didn't die in the pool, not wanting to go to prison again. Clara instead feels sympathetic for the sisters and puts the gun down and gives them their belongings back. Jonna, after calling the police, tells her to leave. Paramedics arrive at the aquatic center and tend to Bree. Jonna gives her engagement ring back, which Clara blackmailed Bree for with the intention of pawning it. Bree asked how she got it back to which Jonna replies, "I killed the monster", referring back to what Bree said about killing their father.

Cast
Alexandra Park as Jonna
Nora-Jane Noone as Bree
Tobin Bell as McGradey
Diane Farr as Clara

Reception
12 Feet Deep received generally positive reviews from critics. JoBlo.com called it a "well crafted-entertaining thriller" and gave it 8/10 stars. That Moment In gave it 3.5/5 stars and said it was "well-directed and engrossing... less a shocker than an intense human drama".

See also
List of films featuring diabetes

References

External links

 
 

2017 horror films
2017 thriller drama films
American thriller drama films
American psychological thriller films
American survival films
Films directed by Matt Eskandari
2010s English-language films
American independent films
2010s psychological horror films
2017 psychological thriller films
2017 drama films
2010s American films